In mathematics, the trigonometric moment problem is formulated as follows: given a finite sequence {α0, ... αn }, does there exist a positive Borel measure μ on the interval [0, 2π] such that

In other words, an affirmative answer to the problems means that {α0, ... αn } are the first n + 1 Fourier coefficients of some positive Borel measure μ on [0, 2π].

Characterization 

The trigonometric moment problem is solvable, that is, {αk} is a sequence of Fourier coefficients, if and only if the (n + 1) × (n + 1) Toeplitz matrix

is positive semidefinite.

The "only if" part of the claims can be verified by a direct calculation.

We sketch an argument for the converse. The positive semidefinite matrix A defines a sesquilinear product on Cn + 1, resulting in a Hilbert space

of dimensional at most n + 1, a typical element of which is an equivalence class denoted by [f]. More specifically, let { e0, ...en } be the standard basis of Cn + 1. Let  be the subspace generated by { [e0], ... [en - 1] } and  be the subspace generated by { [e1], ... [en] }. Define an operator

by

Since

Take a minimal unitary extension U of V, on a possibly larger space (this always exists). According to the spectral theorem, there exists a Borel measure m on the unit circle T such that for all integer k

For k = 0,...,n, the left hand side is

So

Finally, parametrize the unit circle T by eit on [0, 2π] gives

for some suitable measure μ.

Parametrization of solutions 

The above discussion shows that the trigonometric moment problem has infinitely many solutions if the Toeplitz matrix A is invertible. In that case, the solutions to the problem are in bijective correspondence with minimal unitary extensions of the partial isometry V.

References 

 N.I. Akhiezer, The Classical Moment Problem, Olivier and Boyd,  1965.
 N.I. Akhiezer, M.G. Krein, Some Questions in the Theory of Moments, Amer. Math. Soc., 1962.

Probability problems
Measure theory
Functional analysis